Nudgee Cemetery & Crematorium is a large Roman Catholic cemetery at 493 St Vincents Road, Nudgee, Brisbane, Queensland, Australia. The cemetery opened in 1867 and is still operating. Over 31,000 people are buried there.

Services 
The cemetery is opened and operated by the Roman Catholic Archdiocese of Brisbane and the most of those buried there were Roman Catholic. However, burial of people of other faiths is possible, although permission from the bishop was required before 1957. There are areas reserved for various Catholic religious orders as well as an area for above-ground vaults which are preferred by some ethnic groups. Since 2014, a crematorium is available with columbarium walls for the placement of ashes.

Notable people interred
 Amy Vera Ackman, hospital administrator and one of the Sisters of Charity
 Vince Gair, politician and Premier of Queensland
 Ron McAuliffe, politician and one of the founders of rugby league's State of Origin series
 William Webb, judge of the Supreme Court of Queensland, High Court of Australia and President of the International Military Tribunal for the Far East after the end of World War II
 Mother Vincent Whitty, nun who established the Sisters of Mercy in Queensland
 Tom Gorman Hall of fame Rugby League Player for the Toowoomba Clydesdales

See also

 List of cemeteries in Australia

References

External links
 
 Nudgee Cemetery Mapping Interface
 

Cemeteries in Brisbane
1867 establishments in Australia
Crematoria in Queensland
Burials at Nudgee Cemetery
Cemeteries established in the 1860s